The Battle of Salt River Canyon, the Battle of Skeleton Cave, or the Skeleton Cave Massacre was the first principal engagement during the 1872 Tonto Basin Campaign under the command of Lieutenant Colonel George Crook. It was part of the Yavapai War from 1871 to 1875 against the Yavapai people, a Native American tribe in Arizona.

Battle
On December 28, 1872, Crook's men encountered the Yavapai stronghold at Skeleton Cave, located in the Salt River Canyon northeast of present-day Phoenix, Arizona. Crook's force was composed of 130 troopers from the 5th Cavalry Regiment led by Captain William H. Brown and another thirty Apache scouts.

The army took up a position around the mouth of Skeleton Cave and surprised a Yavapai band when they were dancing in celebration over a recent raid. Surrounding the cave, the soldiers opened fire. Some of Brown's men aimed for the roof of the cave, as the Yavapai band refused to surrender. Others, who were personally accompanied by Crook, rolled rocks and boulders down from the cliffs above. One warrior escaped the last volley by crawling on his belly. Realizing that he got out of the cave safely, he jumped on a large stone and let out a war cry, while firing at the soldiers' position. He was shot by a soldier from approx. 800 yards away, hitting the warrior in the chest and killing him. About 75 dead were found in the cave, including a number of women and children. No warriors survived the massacre. The women and children survivors were captured and taken to Camp Grant. Among the dead within the cave was Chief Nanni-chaddi, who had said that no soldier would ever find his stronghold there. This stronghold was only known to the Yavapai and Tonto Apache. Apache scouts led the Army to the stronghold, betraying their own people. Crook followed up this massacre, with another at Turret Peak several weeks later, both considered victories by the Government.  The Apaches soon made peace at Camp Verde in 1873 though some skirmishing continued into 1875.

References

Conflicts in 1872
Battle of Salt River Canyon
Apache Wars
Battles involving the Apache
Battles involving the United States
Battle of Salt River Canyon
History of United States expansionism
19th-century military history of the United States
Battle of Salt River Canyon
December 1872 events